Streptomyces sanyensis is a bacterium species from the genus of Streptomyces which has been isolated from mangrove soil in Sanya in Hainan in China. Streptomyces sanyensis produces indolocarbazoles.

See also 
 List of Streptomyces species

References

Further reading

External links
Type strain of Streptomyces sanyensis at BacDive -  the Bacterial Diversity Metadatabase	

sanyensis
Bacteria described in 2011